The Colorado Department of Public Safety (CDPS) consists of five divisions that cover a breadth of safety programs and services: Colorado Bureau of Investigation (CBI), Colorado State Patrol, Colorado Division of Criminal Justice (DCJ), Colorado Division of Fire Prevention & Control (DFPC), and Colorado Division of Homeland Security and Emergency Management (DHSEM). Additionally, the Executive Director's Office supports operations of the five divisions and houses the Colorado School Safety Resource Center (CSSRC) and Colorado Integrated Criminal Justice Information Systems (CJIS)

Colorado's local law enforcement, emergency management, fire, and criminal justice agencies operate with home-rule authority; while local jurisdictions often partner with and work closely with CDPS agencies, they are not overseen by the Department of Public Safety. When someone has a question or concern about municipal or county safety services, they may need to contact your local jurisdiction.

Structure 
CDPS includes the:

References 

Public Safety